Bell Gardens High School is a public high school in Bell Gardens, California, part of the Montebello Unified School District.

History
The campus was built in the 1930s and 1940s. After years of development and construction, BGHS's new three story building was opened on December 18, 2005.

In 2005, the high school underwent a further phase of renovation when the school's athletic field, otherwise known as "Lancer Stadium", received a $1 million upgrade. This was the change the school decided to make instead of sizing up the auditorium and building up the schools music room and choir room (plans on that are set to happen on the next big loan). The gradually decaying long-standing natural dirt/grass field was replaced with a state of the art synthetic turf playing field along with a new 400 meter track surrounding it. The process commenced during the latter half of the 2004–2005 school year and was gradually completed the following spring in January 2006.

Notable alumni
 Michael Granville, 800 meter high school national record holder at 1:46.45
 Bob Bedell 1961, back-to-back CIF basketball champion, CIF MVP 1961 & 1962, played professionally in American Basketball Association
 Patty Cardenas, 2002, Olympic medalist, water polo
 Eddie Cochran, musician, 1987 inductee of Rock and Roll Hall of Fame
 Lawrence "DJ Muggs" Muggerud, Cypress Hill's DJ and producer; produced tracks for Funkdoobiest, House of Pain, Dizzee Rascal, Ice Cube, U2, Depeche Mode and more
 John Force, NHRA drag racer, 16-time Funny Car division champion, 18-time champion car owner
 Brenda Villa 1998, water polo, 3-time Olympic medal winner
 Esteban Rodriguez, soccer, currently plays for Atlante F.C. in Ascenso MX, on loan from Club Tijuana; started four matches for U.S. at 2011 FIFA U-17 World Cup
 Hector Jiménez, 2006, soccer, defender for Columbus Crew SC. 2-time MLS Cup Champion with  Los Angeles Galaxy in 2011 and 2012
 Johnny Lee Clary, aka professional wrestling champion Johnny Angel, former racist KKK leader turned born again evangelist

References

External links
 Bell Gardens High School website

Bell Gardens, California
High schools in Los Angeles County, California
Public high schools in California
1947 establishments in California